Luo Shuai (born 16 April 1997) is a Chinese modern pentathlete. He won the bronze medal in the men's event at the 2018 Asian Games held in Jakarta, Indonesia.

He qualified to represent China at the 2020 Summer Olympics in Tokyo, Japan after winning the silver medal in the men's individual event at the 2019 Asia/Oceania Championships & Olympic Qualifier.

References

External links 

 

Living people
1997 births
Place of birth missing (living people)
Chinese male modern pentathletes
Asian Games medalists in modern pentathlon
Modern pentathletes at the 2018 Asian Games
Asian Games bronze medalists for China
Medalists at the 2018 Asian Games
Modern pentathletes at the 2020 Summer Olympics
Olympic modern pentathletes of China
20th-century Chinese people
21st-century Chinese people